The 2013–14 Iranian Futsal Super League was the 15th season of the Iran Pro League and the 10th under the name Futsal Super League. Giti Pasand Isfahan were the defending champions. The season featured 12 teams from the 2011–12 Iranian Futsal Super League and two new teams promoted from the 2012–13 Iran Futsal's 1st Division: Giti Pasand Novin and Tasisat Daryaei. The regular season started on 1 August 2013.

Teams

Stadia, locations and personnel

Number of teams by region

Managerial changes

Before the start of the season

In season

League standings

Positions by round

Results table

Clubs season-progress

Statistics

Top goalscorers 

 Last updated: 29 July 2019

Awards 

 Winner: Dabiri Tabriz
 Runners-up: Giti Pasand Isfahan
 Third-Place: Sherkat Melli Haffari Iran
 Top scorer:  Farhad Fakhimzadeh (Dabiri Tabriz) (26)
 Best Player:  Mahdi Javid (Giti Pasand Isfahan)
 Best Manager:  Vahid Shamsaei (Dabiri Tabriz)
 Best Goal Keeper:  Alireza Samimi (Sherkat Melli Haffari Iran)
 Best Young Player:  Mohammad Reza Kourd (Rah Sari)
 Best Pivot:  Mahdi Javid (Giti Pasand Isfahan)
 Best Winger:  Ahmad Esmaeilpour (Giti Pasand Isfahan)
 Best Defender:  Mohammad Keshavarz (Giti Pasand Isfahan)

See also 
 2013–14 Futsal 1st Division
 2014 Iran Futsal's 2nd Division
 2013–14 Futsal Hazfi Cup
 2013–14 Persian Gulf Cup
 2013–14 Azadegan League
 2013–14 Iran Football's 2nd Division
 2013–14 Iran Football's 3rd Division
 2013–14 Hazfi Cup
 Iranian Super Cup

References

External links 
 Iran Futsal League on PersianLeague 
 Futsal Planet 

Iranian Futsal Super League seasons
1